Krakės (formerly Krakiai) is a small town in Kėdainiai district, central Lithuania. It is located on the Smilgaitis River. In the town, there are Catholic church of St. Matthew the Evangelist (built in 1907), Mikalojus Katkus gymnasium, library, medicine station, St. Catherine women convent, Krakės Agriculture Cooperative with former culture center, swimming pool and shop (built in 1983, architect K. Žalnierius). There is the Vytautas Ulevičius museum of wooden sculptures.

Krakės is on the eastern boundary of the Nevėžis Plain, on the Krakės Ridge (altitude 95–100 meters). Roads go to Betygala, Grinkiškis, Kėdainiai, Bokštai, Gudžiūnai and Josvainiai. The Krakės-Dotnuva Forest is 2–3 km away from the town.

History

The first mention of Krakės is from the 14th century. The Krakės Manor was a property of Samogitian bishops between 1421 and 1842. The first church of Krakės was built at 15th century. Krakės is mentioned as a town in 1579. A women monastery of St. Catherine Order was established in Krakės in 1615 and run till 1945 (the wooden monastery burnt at that time), then reestablished in 1997. A market privilege was granted to Krakės in 1790. During 1863, Krakės was important center of the January uprising, on 28 April there was a battle against Russian imperial army. In 1863 and 1914 Krakės was devastated by fires.

On 2 September 1941, 1,125 Jews from Krakės, Baisogala, Dotnuva, Grinkiškis, Gudžiūnai and Surviliškis were murdered at Peštinukai village, about 1.5 kilometers from Krakės. The members of the Einsatzgruppen who committed this crime were Germans from Rollkommando Hamann and Lithuanians collaborators.

During the Soviet era Krakės was a center of kolkhoz and selsovet. Krakės kolkhoz was one of the leading ones in all Lithuanian SSR.

Demography

Images

References

Kėdainiai District Municipality
Towns in Kaunas County